A bicycle basket is a bicycle-mounted basket for carrying cargo, usually light cargo. They are usually used for light shopping duties such as going on daily visits to the shops for fresh bread or milk. Baskets are often mounted on the handlebars and made of traditional basket weaving materials such as wicker and cane or even woven plastic that merely looks like wicker or cane. They can also be made of other materials such as metal mesh.

Front vs. rear baskets

Front baskets
Front baskets are usually mounted on the handlebars though sometimes there are also braces that extend from the basket to the front hub bolt or to tabs on the front fork of the bicycle.

Overloading a front basket can be problematic if not treated sensibly. Heavy loads can throw off the handling of the bicycle as the load is attached to the handlebars and high up on the bicycle frame. Also any load that is far too large could possibly obstruct the rider's vision. Light shopping loads are usually not a problem.

Rear baskets
Other types of baskets may be mounted on a luggage carrier near the rear wheel of the bicycle. These baskets are usually narrower and deeper than the average handlebar basket. Rear baskets function as a hard-sided pannier, carrying the cargo lower on the bicycle, which keeps the center of gravity low and thereby improves handling and control. This placement also cannot obstruct the forward vision of the rider.

See also
 Outline of cycling

References
Boy Scouts of America, Cycling Merit Badge Pamphlet 

Cycling equipment
Bicycle parts